Chernitsa may refer to:

Blackberry
Morus
Tufted duck
Nun

Villages place names:
in Belarus ( [Chernitsa]):
in Vitebsk Region:
Chernitsa, Braslau Raion;
Chernitsa, Lepel Raion;
in Grodno Region:
Chernitsa, Iŭje Raion;
in Minsk Region:
Chernitsa, Lahoysk Raion;
Chernitsa, Smalyavichy Raion;
in Mogilev Region:
 Chernitsa, Babruysk Raion;
in Bulgaria ( [Chernitsa]):
Chernitsa, Burgas Province;
in Moldova ( [Chernitsa]):
Cernița, Florești District;
in Poland ( [Chernitsa]):
Lower Silesian Voivodeship:
Czernica — a gmina in Wrocław County (powiat);
Czernica — a village in Wrocław County,  centre of Gmina Czernica;
Czernica — a village in Gmina Jeżów Sudecki, Jelenia Góra County;
Czernica — a village in Gmina Dobromierz, Świdnica County;
Silesian Voivodeship:
Czernica — a village in Gmina Gaszowice, Rybnik County;
Świętokrzyskie Voivodeship:
Czernica — a village in Gmina Staszów, Staszów County;
Pomeranian Voivodeship:
Czernica — a village in Gmina Brusy, Chojnice County;
in Ukraine ( [Chernytsia]):
in Lviv Oblast:
Chernytsia — a village in Stryi Raion;
Chernytsia — a village in Zolochiv Raion;
in Rivne Oblast:
Chernytsia — a village in Korets Raion;

Rivers:

In Poland ( [Chernitsa]):
Czernica, tributary of Czerna Mała, Lubusz Voivodeship;
Czernica, tributary of Gwda, Pomeranian Voivodeship;
Czernica, tributary of Mołstowa, West Pomeranian Voivodeship;
Czernica, tributary of Rega, West Pomeranian Voivodeship

Mountains:

In Poland ( [Chernitsa]):
Czernica, Eastern Sudetes